Thomas Rath may refer to:

Thomas D. Rath, American lawyer and former Attorney General of New Hampshire
Thomas Rath (footballer) (born 1970), German football midfielder
Tom Rath (born 1975), American business consultant